was a Japanese daimyō of the early Edo period, who ruled the Takamatsu Domain. Yorishige was the first son of Tokugawa Yorifusa, and Tokugawa Mitsukuni was the third son of Tokugawa Yorifusa, the first Tokugawa daimyō of  Mito Domain; this made him the grandson of Tokugawa Ieyasu.

One of his daughters married Takatsukasa Kanehiro.

Ancestry

References

https://web.archive.org/web/20120212202052/http://www.city.takamatsu.kagawa.jp/kyouiku/bunkabu/rekisi/NAIYOU/yuisyo/kakukou/matu.htm
http://www.kcn-net.org/bunjo/eishoji/okatsu.htm
https://web.archive.org/web/20071001021023/http://nekhet.ddo.jp/people/japan/gorenshi03.html#styorisige

|-

Daimyo
Tokugawa clan
1622 births
1695 deaths